Edward A. Everett may refer to:
 Edward A. Everett (Wisconsin politician)
 Edward A. Everett (New York politician)